Slobodan Janjić (born 17 February 1987), is a Serbian futsal player who plays for CS Informatica Timişoara and the Serbia national futsal team.

References

External links
UEFA profile

1987 births
Living people
Serbian men's futsal players